Corey Parker may refer to:

Corey Parker (actor) (born 1965), American actor
Corey Parker (rugby league) (born 1982), Australian rugby league footballer
Corey Parker (singer) on Swing Set